Jean-Baptiste Urrutia (born 6 November 1901, Les Aduldes, Basses-Pyrénées, France – died 15 January 1979, Montbeton, France) was a French Roman Catholic missionary from the Paris Foreign Missions Society. He was an attendee at the Second Vatican Council.

Ordained in 1925, he was sent to Annam in French Indochina. He taught at the An Ninh Minor Seminary, where he had François-Xavier Nguyễn Văn Thuận as a student. He ordained Thuận in 1953. Urrutia was consecrated bishop in partibus in 1948 and made Titular Bishop of Isauropolis as well as apostolic vicar of the Huế during the Indochina War. 

He retired in 1960, near Our Lady of La Vang Sanctuary and was expelled from Vietnam in 1975 by the communists. He spent his last years in Montbeton, France, where he died in 1979, aged 77.

References

External links
Archives of the Foreign Missions Society (French)
Urrutia profile at Catholic-Hierarchy website

1901 births
1979 deaths
French-Basque people
French Roman Catholic missionaries
Roman Catholic missionaries in Vietnam
French expatriates in Vietnam
Paris Foreign Missions Society missionaries
Participants in the Second Vatican Council